The Leamington & Warwick Tramways & Omnibus Company operated a tramway service between Warwick and Leamington Spa between 1881 and 1930.

History

From 1872 various tramway projects were considered until the Leamington Tramways Order of 1879 was granted. The Leamington & Warwick Tramways & Omnibus Company Ltd was registered on 18 February 1880. On 14 May 1881 they signed a contract with John Fell of Leamington for the construction of the line. On 17 November 1880, the work was completed. The cost of construction had been £14,800.

The line ran from outside the Lord Leycester Hospital, through Jury Street, Smith Street, and Emscote Road over the River Avon into Leamington, along Warwick Street, down The Parade and through to Leamington Spa railway station.

It opened for passengers on 21 November 1881. It was a single track line with 2 tracks on Smith Street in Warwick, and additional passing loops and line into stables at Coten End. There were seven trams operating a 13-minute headway service. Four were Metropolitan cars, two were Brown Marshall and one was ex-Birmingham Tramways Company.

Electric operation

The company was obtained by Brush Electric Traction in 1900 and the Warwick Tramways Order of 1900 and Leamington Tramways Order of 1901 allowed for electrification. The company re-built the tramway in 1905 and replaced the horse cars with electric powered vehicles. The company took the opportunity to double track most of the line. The power station was built specially for the tramway conversion. The electric service started on 12 July 1905. In 1912 the tramway and lighting company was purchased by Balfour Beatty and Company.

Fleet
The company livery was green and cream.
1-6 Brush cars 1905
7-12 Brush cars 1905 (purchased from the Taunton Tramways)
14 Balfour Beatty and Company 1921

No 7 was damaged beyond repair in an accident on 3 January 1916 when it ran away and crashed into the Warwick Arms.

On closure in 1930, No 11 was sold to the Llandudno and Colwyn Bay Electric Railway.

The remains of No. 11 were last seen in 1956 by John Price on the closure of the L&CBET.

Surviving trams

Horse car 1 survives at the National Tramway Museum in an unrestored condition.

Closure

The system was closed on 16 August 1930.

References

Tram transport in England

New book published in 2019:-

The Leamington and Warwick Tramway / Allan Jennings & Peter Coulls / Sydni Books / 

Price:- £15.95

Tramway Review Vol. 4 No. 31 1961